Rhytidoponera is a large genus of ants in the subfamily Ectatomminae. The genus is known from Australia and Melanesia, with New Caledonia as the most eastern limit.

Some Rhytidoponera species have both winged alate queens and gamergates. All known queenless species of Rhytidoponera are polygynous.

Species

Rhytidoponera abdominalis Viehmeyer, 1912
Rhytidoponera acanthoponeroides Viehmeyer, 1924
Rhytidoponera aciculata (Smith, 1858)
Rhytidoponera aenescens Emery, 1900
Rhytidoponera anceps Emery, 1898
Rhytidoponera aquila Ward, 1984
Rhytidoponera araneoides (Le Guillou, 1842)
Rhytidoponera arborea Ward, 1984
Rhytidoponera aspera (Roger, 1860)
Rhytidoponera atropurpurea Emery, 1914
Rhytidoponera aurata (Roger, 1861)
Rhytidoponera barnardi Clark, 1936
Rhytidoponera barretti Clark, 1941
Rhytidoponera borealis Crawley, 1918
Rhytidoponera carinata Clark, 1936
Rhytidoponera celtinodis Wilson, 1958
Rhytidoponera cerastes Crawley, 1925
Rhytidoponera chalybaea Emery, 1901
Rhytidoponera chnoopyx Brown, 1958
Rhytidoponera clarki Donisthorpe, 1943
Rhytidoponera confusa Ward, 1980
Rhytidoponera convexa (Mayr, 1876)
Rhytidoponera cornuta (Emery, 1895)
Rhytidoponera crassinoda (Forel, 1907)
Rhytidoponera cristata (Mayr, 1876)
Rhytidoponera croesus Emery, 1901
Rhytidoponera depilis Ward, 1984
Rhytidoponera dubia Crawley, 1915
Rhytidoponera enigmatica Ward, 1980
Rhytidoponera eremita Clark, 1936
Rhytidoponera ferruginea Clark, 1936
Rhytidoponera flavicornis Clark, 1936
Rhytidoponera flavipes (Clark, 1941)
Rhytidoponera flindersi Clark, 1936
Rhytidoponera foreli Crawley, 1918
Rhytidoponera foveolata Crawley, 1925
Rhytidoponera fulgens (Emery, 1883)
Rhytidoponera fuliginosa Clark, 1936
Rhytidoponera greavesi Clark, 1941
Rhytidoponera gregoryi Clark, 1936
Rhytidoponera haeckeli (Forel, 1910)
Rhytidoponera hanieli Forel, 1913
Rhytidoponera hilli Crawley, 1915
Rhytidoponera impressa (Mayr, 1876)
Rhytidoponera incisa Crawley, 1915
Rhytidoponera inops Emery, 1900
Rhytidoponera inornata Crawley, 1922
Rhytidoponera insularis Ward, 1984
†Rhytidoponera kirghizorum Dlussky, 1981
Rhytidoponera koumensis Ward, 1984
Rhytidoponera kurandensis Brown, 1958
Rhytidoponera laciniosa Viehmeyer, 1912
Rhytidoponera lamellinodis Santschi, 1919
Rhytidoponera laticeps Forel, 1915
Rhytidoponera levior Crawley, 1925
Rhytidoponera litoralis Ward, 1984
Rhytidoponera luteipes Ward, 1984
Rhytidoponera maledicta Forel, 1915
Rhytidoponera maniae (Forel, 1900)
Rhytidoponera mayri (Emery, 1883)
Rhytidoponera metallica (Smith, 1858)
Rhytidoponera micans Clark, 1936
Rhytidoponera mimica Ward, 1984
Rhytidoponera mirabilis Clark, 1936
Rhytidoponera nexa Stitz, 1912
Rhytidoponera nitida Clark, 1936
Rhytidoponera nitidiventris Ward, 1984
Rhytidoponera nodifera (Emery, 1895)
Rhytidoponera nudata (Mayr, 1876)
Rhytidoponera numeensis (André, 1889)
Rhytidoponera opaciventris Ward, 1984
Rhytidoponera peninsularis Brown, 1958
Rhytidoponera petiolata Clark, 1936
Rhytidoponera pilosula Clark, 1936
Rhytidoponera pulchella (Emery, 1883)
Rhytidoponera punctata (Smith, 1858)
Rhytidoponera punctigera Crawley, 1925
Rhytidoponera punctiventris (Forel, 1900)
Rhytidoponera purpurea (Emery, 1887)
Rhytidoponera reflexa Clark, 1936
Rhytidoponera reticulata (Forel, 1893)
Rhytidoponera rotundiceps Viehmeyer, 1914
Rhytidoponera rufescens (Forel, 1900)
Rhytidoponera rufithorax Clark, 1941
Rhytidoponera rufiventris Forel, 1915
Rhytidoponera rufonigra Clark, 1936
Rhytidoponera scaberrima (Emery, 1895)
Rhytidoponera scabra (Mayr, 1876)
Rhytidoponera scabrior Crawley, 1925
Rhytidoponera socra (Forel, 1894)
Rhytidoponera spoliata (Emery, 1895)
Rhytidoponera strigosa (Emery, 1887)
Rhytidoponera subcyanea Emery, 1897
Rhytidoponera tasmaniensis Emery, 1898
Rhytidoponera taurus (Forel, 1910)
Rhytidoponera tenuis (Forel, 1900)
Rhytidoponera terrestris Ward, 1984
Rhytidoponera trachypyx Brown, 1958
Rhytidoponera turneri (Forel, 1910)
Rhytidoponera tyloxys Brown, 1958
Rhytidoponera versicolor Brown, 1958
Rhytidoponera victoriae (André, 1896)
Rhytidoponera violacea (Forel, 1907)
Rhytidoponera viridis (Clark, 1941)
Rhytidoponera wilsoni Brown, 1958
Rhytidoponera yorkensis Forel, 1915

References

External links

Ectatomminae
Ant genera